The 2006 Iowa gubernatorial election took place November 7, 2006. The incumbent governor, Tom Vilsack, a Democrat, had served two terms and decided not to seek a third term. In the election, Chet Culver defeated Jim Nussle to win the governorship, by a margin of  54.4 percent to 44.1 percent. 

, this was the last time a Democrat won the governorship of Iowa. This election marks the first time Democrats won three consecutive gubernatorial elections in the state since 1966, and the only time Democrats have ever done so for four-year terms.

Democratic primary

Candidates

Won primary 
Chet Culver, Iowa Secretary of State (1999–present), son of former United States Senator John Culver
Running mate: Patty Judge, Secretary of Agriculture of Iowa (1999–present) and former State Senator

Defeated in primary 
Mike Blouin, former director of the Iowa Department of Economic Development (2003-2005), former U.S. Representative for IA-02 (1975-1979), and 1st director of the Information Security Oversight Office (1979-1980)
Running mate: Andrea McGuire, physician
Ed Fallon, Iowa State Representative (1993–present)
Sal Mohamed, engineer and 2004 Democratic candidate for Congress

Declined to run 

 Sally Pederson, Lieutenant Governor of Iowa (1999–present)

Results

Republican primary

Candidates
Jim Nussle, U.S. Representative

Withdrew
Bob Vander Plaats, president and CEO of The Family Leader, to become Nussle's running-mate for the general election

Results

Independents

Green
Wendy Barth, peace activist and software engineer from Cedar Rapids

Libertarian
Kevin Litten, pharmacist from Cedar Rapids

General election
The Democratic nominee, Iowa Secretary of State Chet Culver, selected Iowa Secretary of Agriculture Patty Judge as his running mate. Judge had previously run for the Democratic nomination for Governor before dropping out to run for Lieutenant Governor. The Republican nominee, U.S. Congressman Jim Nussle, selected Sioux City businessman Bob Vander Plaats as his running mate. Vander Plaats, like Judge, had previously run for his party's nomination before dropping out to run for Lieutenant Governor.

Predictions

Polling

Results

See also
U.S. gubernatorial elections, 2006
State of Iowa
Governors of Iowa

References

External links

Candidates
Culver's Campaign Website
Nussle's Campaign Website 
Barth's Campaign Website
Litten's Campaign Website
Fallon's Campaign Website
Mohamed's Campaign Website

Iowa Secretary of State
Summary Election Results

Governor
2006
2006 United States gubernatorial elections